Wai Ching Ho (born 16 November 1943) is a Hong Kong film and television actress.

She is known for her role as Madame Gao in the Marvel Cinematic Universe onscreen, in Daredevil (2015–2016), Iron Fist and The Defenders (both 2017).

Selected filmography

Film

Television

References

External links

1943 births
Living people
Hong Kong film actresses
Hong Kong television actresses
Hong Kong people
20th-century Hong Kong actresses
21st-century Hong Kong actresses